Jean-Luc Seret (born 14 September 1951 in Rouen, France) is a French chess player, International Master and four-time winner of the French Chess Championship.

Playing career
Seret was a member of the French team at the 1974, 1976, 1980, 1982 and 1984 Chess Olympiad. He obtained the International Master title in 1982. Seret won the French Chess Championship in 1980, 1981, 1984 and 1985. During the 1989 Championship, Seret was involved in a violent altercation with Gilles Andruet who subsequently withdrew from the tournament.

References

1951 births
Living people
French chess players
Chess International Masters
Chess Olympiad competitors
Sportspeople from Rouen